The Udāna is a Buddhist scripture, part of the Pali Canon of Theravada Buddhism. It is included there in the Sutta Pitaka's Khuddaka Nikaya. The title might be translated "inspired utterances". The book comprises 80 such utterances, most in verse, each preceded by a narrative giving the context in which the Buddha utters it.

The famous story of the Blind men and an elephant appears in Udana, under Tittha Sutta (Ud. 6.4).

Structure of the Udana
The Udana is composed of eight chapters (vagga) of ten discourses each. The chapter titles are:
Bodhivagga (Awakening chapter)
Mucalindavagga (King Mucalinda chapter)
Nandavagga (Ven. Nanda chapter)
Meghiyavagga (Ven. Meghiya chapter)
 (Lay Follower Sona chapter)
Jaccandhavagga (Blind From Birth chapter)
Cullavagga (Minor chapter)
 (Pataligamiya chapter)

Each discourse includes a prose portion followed by a verse. At the end of each prose section, as prelude to the verse, the following formulaic text is included:

Then, on realizing the significance of that, the Blessed One on that occasion exclaimed:

An alternate translation could be: Then, upon realizing the significance of that, the Blessed One on that occasion exclaimed this inspired utterance (udāna):

It is from such "exclamations" that the collection derives its name.

Dating of text
This is one of the earlier Buddhist scriptures, A recent analysis concludes that the text of the Pali discourses, including the Udāna, was largely fixed in its current form, with only small differences from the modern text, by the first century B.C.E.

Hinüber identifies this type of discourse (although not necessarily the existing collection itself) as being part of the pre-canonical  (Pali for "nine-fold") which classified discourses according to their form and style, such as geyya (mixed prose and verse), gāthā (four-lined couplets), udāna (utterances) and jātaka (birth story).

Relationship to other sacred texts
Within Buddhist literature, about a fourth of the Udana's prose sections correspond to text elsewhere in the Pali Canon, particularly in the Vinaya. In addition, in regards to Tibetan Buddhist literature, von Hinüber suggests that the Udana formed the original core of the Sanskrit Udānavarga, to which verses from the Dhammapada were added.

In terms of non-Buddhist texts, some Udana concepts can be found in the Vedantic Upanishads and in Jain texts.

Translations
Tr Major-General D. M. Strong, 1902
"Verses of uplift", in Minor Anthologies of the Pali Canon, volume II, tr F. L. Woodward, 1935, Pali Text Society, Bristol
Tr John D. Ireland, Buddhist Publication Society, Kandy, Sri Lanka, 1990; later reprinted in 1 volume with his translation of the Itivuttaka
Tr Peter Masefield, 1994, Pali Text Society, Bristol; the PTS's preferred translation; its declared aim is to translate in accordance with the commentary's interpretation
Bilingual Pali-English study edition, 2010 Theravada Tipitaka Press
 Tr Ānandajoti Bhikkhu, Udāna. Exalted Utterances ; Last revised version 2008
 Tr Bhikkhu Mahinda (Anagarika Mahendra), Udāna: Book of Inspired Utterances, Bilingual Pali-English First Edition 2022, Dhamma Publishers, Roslindale MA;  .

References

Citations

Sources 

 Hinüber, Oskar von (2000). A Handbook of Pāli Literature. Berlin: Walter de Gruyter. .
 Nakamura (1980). Indian Buddhism. Japan; reprinted Motilal Banarsidass, Delhi
 Rhys Davids, T.W. & William Stede (eds.) (1921-5). The Pali Text Society's Pali–English Dictionary. Chipstead: Pali Text Society. A general on-line search engine for the PED is available at http://dsal.uchicago.edu/dictionaries/pali/. 
 Sri Lanka Tripitaka Project (SLTP) (n.d.).  (Ud. 6–4, in Pali). Retrieved 2007-10-12 from "MettaNet" at http://www.metta.lk/tipitaka/2Sutta-Pitaka/5Khuddaka-Nikaya/03Udana/06-Jaccandhavaggo-p1.html#six4.
 Thanissaro Bhikkhu (trans.) (1994). Tittha Sutta: Various Sectarians (1) (Ud. 6.4, in English)). Retrieved 2007-10-12 from "Access to Insight" at http://www.accesstoinsight.org/tipitaka/kn/ud/ud.6.04.than.html.

External links 
 Udāna translated by Sāmaṇera Mahinda.
 The Udâna Translated from the Pali by Dawsonne Melanchthon Strong
 Udana at Access to Insight; selections from translations by Ireland and Thanissaro.
 Udana. Pali - English a new version of the Udana in a bi-lingual edition.(Link to commercial bookseller order page)

Khuddaka Nikaya